Agostino "Tino" Buazzelli (13 September 1922 – 20 October 1980) was an Italian stage, television and film actor. He appeared in 46 films between 1948 and 1978.

After a diploma  of education, Buazzelli enrolled the Accademia d'Arte Drammatica in Rome, graduating in 1946. He made his debut the following year, in the stage company Maltagliati-Gassman. He made his film debut in 1948, in Riccardo Freda's Il cavaliere misterioso. Buazzelli's major successes relates to theatre, notably several stage works played in Piccolo Teatro in Milan between fifties and sixties, and his interpretation of Brecht's Life of Galileo (1963) referred as the peak of his career. Buazzelli had also a significant television success as Nero Wolfe in a series of television films starred between 1969 and 1971.

Partial filmography

 The Mysterious Cavalier (1948) - Josef, il servo del conte Ipatieff (uncredited)
 Guarany (1948)
 The Flame That Will Not Die (1949)
 Vivere a sbafo (1949)
 Margaret of Cortona (1950) - Rinaldo degli Uberti
 The Outlaws (1950) - maresciallo Fulvio
 Stormbound (1950) - Sergeant
 Against the Law (1950) - Il commissario
 Totò Tarzan (1950) - Spartaco
 The Transporter (1950) - Dimitri
 Bluebeard's Six Wives (1950) - Ladislao Tzigety / Barbablù
 The Count of Saint Elmo (1951) - Barone Annibale Cassano
 The Crowd (1951)
 The Tired Outlaw (1952) - Paco
 I morti non pagano tasse (1952) - Arturo
 Captain Phantom (1953) - Damian Pinto
 The Most Wanted Man (1953) - Parker
 Angels of Darkness (1954)
 Neapolitan Carousel (1954) - Capt. Spaccatrippa
 Cardinal Lambertini (1954) - Il conte Davia
 Toto in Hell (1955) - Il diavolo segretario
 Il conte Aquila (1955) - Il giudice Menghin
 I baccanali di Tiberio (1960) - Tiberio / Zio Anthony
 Il corazziere (1960) - Quirino Lanfranchi
 Ghosts of Rome (1961) - Fra Bartolomeo di Roviano
 Chi lavora è perduto (1963) - Claudio
 Vino, whisky e acqua salata (1963)
 I cuori infranti (1963) - Baron Friedrich von Tellen (segment "La manina di Fatma")
 Ça ira - Il fiume della rivolta (1964)
 Thrilling (1965) - The shrink (segment "Il vittimista")
 A Maiden for a Prince (1965) - Duca di mantova
 After the Fox (1966) - Siepi
 Devil in the Brain (1972) - Doctor Emilio Bontempi

References

External links

1922 births
1980 deaths
People from Frascati
Italian male film actors
Accademia Nazionale di Arte Drammatica Silvio D'Amico alumni
20th-century Italian male actors
Italian male stage actors
Italian male television actors